Stig or STIG may refer to:

People
 Stig (given name)
 Nickname of Robert Stigwood (1934–2016), musical act manager

Arts and entertainment
 The Stig, a masked racing driver on the UK television show Top Gear
 Stig (singer), Finnish performer Pasi Siitonen
 Stig, the title character of Stig of the Dump, a children's book and two TV series
 Stig, the title character of Stig's Inferno, a comic by Ty Templeton
 Stig, a "member" of the fictional (later real) band the Rutles, a parody of the Beatles

Technology
 Security Technical Implementation Guide, a computing security methodology
 Steam-injected gas turbine, an energy production technology; See Cheng cycle

Other uses
 Stig (Serbia), a region in eastern Serbia

See also
 Stian, a related Scandinavian name
 Stigg of the Dump, an underground hip hop producer in Canada
 Stigler, a surname
 

de:Stig
no:Stig
sv:Stig Noise